Lessertia dentichelis is a spider species found in Europe, the Canary Islands, Madeira, Canada and New Zealand. The species is notably found in Lithuania.

There is also a notable population in Kungsträdgården metro station, in Stockholm, the only location in Sweden where the species can be found. While it is unknown exactly how the species arrived, it has been suggested the spider arrived unknown through transportation from elsewhere in Europe, or that the species existed in the archways of old buildings before the subway was built.

See also 
 List of Linyphiidae species (I–P)

References

External links 

Linyphiidae
Spiders of the Canary Islands
Spiders of Europe
Arthropods of Madeira
Spiders of North America
Spiders of New Zealand
Spiders described in 1884